Bethel Manor is a census-designated place (CDP) in York County, Virginia, United States. The population as of the 2010 Census was 3,792.  Bethel Manor is a Military Family Community for Joint Base Langley-Eustis.

References

Census-designated places in York County, Virginia
Census-designated places in Virginia